Antonia Rebecca Caroline Romeo (née Rice-Evans; born 20 October 1974) is a British civil servant. She is currently serving as the permanent secretary at the Ministry of Justice and Clerk of the Crown in Chancery. She was the permanent secretary at the Department for International Trade and before that, the British consul-general in New York for the Foreign and Commonwealth Office and concurrently director-general for economic and commercial affairs in the USA.

Early life and education 
Romeo was born on 20 October 1974 in London, England, to Peter Rice-Evans and Catherine Rice-Evans. Her mother worked full-time as a professor of biochemistry. She was educated at North London Collegiate School and then Westminster School. Romeo's undergraduate education at Brasenose College, Oxford, culminated in her earning an MA in philosophy, politics and economics.

Career 
In 1996 Romeo joined the strategic consultancy firm Oliver Wyman where she worked for three years. In 1999 Romeo left the firm and earned an MSc in economics from the London School of Economics.

Joining the Civil Service
In 2000, Romeo applied for a one-year temporary contract as a professional economist in the Lord Chancellor's Department. In a 2016 interview with Management Today Romeo stated that at the time she "barely knew what the civil service did."

In 2004, returning to work after the birth of her first child, Romeo became the head of the Information Rights Division within the new Department for Constitutional Affairs, in charge of freedom of information and related government policies.

In 2006, Romeo became principal private secretary to the Lord Chancellor — initially Charles Falconer, then from 2007 Jack Straw.

In 2008, Romeo transferred to the Foreign and Commonwealth Office as the Director of Whitehall Liaison Department, responsible for the FCO's relations with intelligence agencies and other government departments. She left the role in 2010.

Cabinet Office
Following the 2010 United Kingdom general election and the subsequent formation of the Cameron–Clegg coalition, Romeo transferred to the Cabinet Office as the Executive Director in the new Efficiency and Reform Group under Francis Maude. The group was responsible for reforming the government's governance and board model, as well as working with businesses.

Ministry of Justice
In 2011, after 18 months at the Cabinet Office, Romeo moved back to the Ministry of Justice, taking on the role of Director General, Transformation. Romeo was made responsible for reform and savings programmes, strategy, digital services, communications, group HR and group estates. Two years later, Romeo changed role to Director General, Criminal Justice, taking over from Helen Edwards. Romeo was responsible for all criminal justice policy and major programmes, Romeo also delivered a 2.5 year, £1bn programme to reduce reoffending among ex-offenders. Romeo left the role in February 2015 and was succeeded by Indra Morris.

Cabinet Office - Economic and Domestic Affairs Secretariat
During the 2015 election Romeo took on the role of director general at the Economic and Domestic Affairs Secretariat and was responsible for delivering the prime minister's top policy priorities. Her work involved coordinating policy advice to the Prime Minister and the Cabinet, oversight of the Implementation Unit, and the operation of the Implementation Task Forces. Romeo later described this as her "dream job."  After nine months she moved with her family to New York. Romeo later said that the Cabinet Secretary Jeremy Heywood had asked her to stay in the civil service, and encouraged her to take on a role in New York as the Government's envoy to the tech sector.
Before undertaking the role Romeo attended Columbia University in New York where she completed the advanced management programme.

Special Envoy to US technology companies
From October 2015 to 2016 Romeo served as the government's special envoy to U.S. technology companies. The formal title was "Her Majesty's Government's Envoy to the United States' Communications Service Providers".
In this role she worked with US-based technology firms across prosperity, security, and regulatory issues.

Her Majesty's Consul General
In July 2016, Romeo was appointed Her Majesty's Consul General in New York, replacing Danny Lopez. Aged forty-one, Romeo was the first woman to hold the position in its two-hundred-and-thirty-one year history. In addition to her duties as Consul General, Romeo was given the additional role of Director General Economic and Commercial Affairs USA, under the auspices of UK Trade & Investment. As DGECA USA, Romeo's responsibilities included oversight of the North American operations of the foreign commercial arm of the UK Government.

In a talk given to Global Citizen magazine in October 2016, Romeo said that following the Brexit vote, the UK was no less committed to its international standing than it was before. "We want to become more globally outward facing," she told the room. "Britain isn't turning in on itself." Asked about xenophobic rhetoric used in the Brexit campaign Romeo replied that the government "thinks xenophobia and hate crime are completely unacceptable." She added: "We want to be engaged and tolerant at home."

Romeo left the role as Director General Economic and Commercial Affairs USA in March 2017, after nine months.

Department for International Trade
In January 2017 Romeo was appointed as permanent secretary of the Department for International Trade. Her first day was on 27 March 2017, just two days before Article 50 was triggered, a major step in the UK's exit from the European Union. Romeo's team was tasked with ensuring that the UK was prepared to leave the EU on 29 March 2019. During that time, they developed and published a temporary tariff regime, negotiated vital continuity agreements, and secured continued participation in the GPA to ensure UK businesses could continue to bid for public sector contracts globally worth more than £1.3 trillion per year. At DIT Romeo was in charge of trade policy, trade negotiation and market access arrangements with countries outside the EU, global trade promotion and finance, and inward and outward business investment.

#dataisGREAT campaign
In the course of her duties as Director General Economic and Commercial Affairs, Romeo and her staff had a number of contacts with British tech company Cambridge Analytica. The company was keen to expand in the US following its success on the Trump campaign. Romeo met with executives and as a result of the meeting her subordinates invited the company to take part in a potential spin-off of the "GREAT campaign" titled "#dataisGREAT". The spin-off campaign was never launched.

Return to the Ministry of Justice
In January 2021 Romeo moved back to the Ministry of Justice as permanent secretary.

Other interests
As the Civil Service's Gender Champion, one of Romeo's first roles was to set up the Gender Equality Leadership Group, a group of director general level gender champions from all departments.

Board memberships
Romeo is President of the Whitehall Choir, an amateur choir in London.  She is also a member of the Civil Service Board. She is a trustee of the Donmar Warehouse theatre, and the John Browne Charitable Trust. From 2016 to 2021 Romeo was a Member of the International Advisory Board of British American Businesses (BAB).

Personal life
She married John Romeo, a managing partner in charge of North America for Oliver Wyman, and has three children.

References

External links 
 Site of the British Consulate-General in New York
 Romeo's Twitter account

Living people
1974 births
People educated at North London Collegiate School
People educated at Westminster School, London
Alumni of Brasenose College, Oxford
British diplomats
British civil servants
British consultants
Place of birth missing (living people)
Permanent Under-Secretaries of State for Justice
Civil servants in the Lord Chancellor's Department